"Moscas en la Casa" is a Latin pop ballad written and performed by Colombian singer Shakira, released as the sixth and final single from her fourth studio album Dónde Están los Ladrones? (1998).

In the song, Shakira explains the sadness that she feels after a broken relationship and how she has let herself go, while she continues to wait for him to come back. "Moscas en la Casa" was released as a radio-only single. The song did not received a music video, however, a performance from the live album MTV Unplugged was released instead.

Background and release
"Moscas en la Casa" was released in 1999 as the sixth single from the album. Shakira wrote the song for Puerto Rican telenovela actor Osvaldo Ríos, her boyfriend at the time for who she also had written the songs "Tú" and "Ojos Así".

Music video
The music video for the song is actually a recording from her first live album MTV Unplugged which was recorded in New York City in 1999.

Track listing

Charts

References

1990s ballads
Shakira songs
1999 singles
1998 songs
Pop ballads
Songs written by Shakira
Sony Music Latin singles
Spanish-language songs